Thomas Weston may refer to:

 Thomas Weston, 4th Earl of Portland (1609–1688)
 Thomas Weston (actor) (1737–1776),  British actor
 Thomas Weston (horticulturalist) (1866–1935), Australian horticulturalist
 Thomas Weston (merchant adventurer) (c. 1584–1647/48), English merchant and settler in America
 Thomas Weston (MP), member of parliament for Cricklade 1369–1388
 Thomas Crowley Weston (born 1958), Cook Islands justice
 Thomas S. Weston (1836–1912), New Zealand judge and politician 
 Thomas Shailer Weston Jr. (1868–1931), member of the New Zealand Legislative Council
 Tommy Weston (1890–1952), English footballer
 Tommy Weston (jockey) (1902–1981), British jockey

See also
Tom Weston (disambiguation)